Siberian Education (known as Deadly Code in the United States;) is a 2013 Italian crime-drama film directed by Gabriele Salvatores. It is based on the allegedly autobiographic novel with the same name written by Nicolai Lilin, the pen name of Nikolai Verzhbitsky. The film was nominated to 11 David di Donatello awards, including Best Film and Best Director. Mauro Pagani won the Ciak d'oro for Best Score.
The novel by Lilin has never been published in Russia and an investigation by a Russian journalist found that the story was a fabricated hoax by Lilin.

Many of the actors, especially child actors, are Lithuanian. Winter scenes were also shot in Lithuania (instead of the actual Russia). All other scenes were shot in parts of Italy. The movie itself was filmed in English, with Italian subtitles.

Plot 
Kolyma and Gagarin are two boys in an ethnically Siberian village in Transnistria being raised by Kolyma's grandfather Kuzja. Kuzja imposes a very strict education to the children, focusing on hatred for the Soviet officials such as bankers or the military, which are regarded as enemies. Following one of their robbery attempts against the Soviets, Gagarin is captured, tried and imprisoned. Seven years later Gagarin is freed, but he discovers that his world has completely changed and he does not know how to succeed in solving his problems. Gagarin finally discovers that the ideals of his people have collapsed in the drug trade, so he enters into this new system but he ends up in conflict with Kolyma.

Cast 
 John Malkovich as Grandfather Kuzja
 Arnas Fedaravicius as Kolyma
 Vilius Tumalavicius as Gagarin
 Peter Stormare as Ink
 Eleanor Tomlinson as Xenya
 Jonas Trukanas as Mel
 Erikas Zaremba as Vitalic
 James Tratas as Shorty

Reception
Siberian Education received positive reviews. James Luxford from The National (UAE) gave to the film a score of 3/5 writing:
"Sombre and grim, this coming-of-age tale keeps the scale small but the issues big, hinting at wider questions of good and evil in the world, but an inability to offer truly memorable moments creates a ceiling artistically". He also appreciated Salvatores' script and Malkovich's performance.
Catherine Brown from Filmink praised the film saying that:"
Despite its faults, the film is worth viewing not only for Malkovich's brilliant performance". 

The Hollywood Reporter gave to the film a positive review calling it: "[...] a strong piece of exotica".

References

External links 

2013 films
English-language Italian films
Films based on Russian novels
Films directed by Gabriele Salvatores
Films set in Moldova
Films shot in Lithuania
2010s English-language films
2010s Italian films